Hud ('Skin') is a 1986 Norwegian crime film directed by and starring Vibeke Løkkeberg. It was screened in the Un Certain Regard section at the 1987 Cannes Film Festival.

Plot summary

Cast 
 Vibeke Løkkeberg as Vilde
 Keve Hjelm as Sigurd, Vilde's Stepfather
 Terence Stamp as Edward, an artist
 Elisabeth Granneman as Vilde's Mother
 Frank Audun Kvamtrø as Antonies
 Per Jansen as Sjur
 Tonje Kleivdal Kristiansen as Malene
 Per Oscarsson as The Vicar
 Thale Svenneby as Vilde som barn

Literature

References

External links 
 
 
 

1986 films
1980s crime films
1980s Norwegian-language films
Films directed by Vibeke Løkkeberg
Norwegian horror films
Films about dysfunctional families
Norwegian crime films
Films scored by Arne Nordheim